Capitol Air was a charter airline and scheduled passenger air carrier based in the United States which was operational from 1946 to its bankruptcy filing on November 23, 1984. It was founded as Capitol Airways in 1946, and then renamed Capitol International Airways in 1967. In 1981, the airline changed its name to Capitol Air and was operating scheduled domestic and international passenger flights that year.

History
Capitol Airways was founded on June 11, 1946 by Jesse F. Stallings (1909-1979), an airline captain, and Richmond Mclnnis, his associate. During the first few years, Capitol Airways operated a flight school and aircraft sales agency at Cumberland Field in Nashville, Tennessee.

By the early 1950s Capitol operated a fleet of piston engine transport planes including DC-3s and Lockheed Lodestars.  Capitol Airways began to transport priority freight for the U.S. Air Force in 1954. By 1956, Capitol was operating a fleet of more than twenty Curtiss C-46 transport planes, and had become a primary civilian carrier for the military's Logistic Air Support (LOGAIR) program. Capitol then entered the international charter flight market, operating a fleet of Lockheed Constellations. By the late 1950s, Capitol moved all of its flight operations to Wilmington, Delaware at New Castle Airport.

In 1963 Capitol Airways was one of the first charter airlines to operate jet aircraft in the form of a new Douglas DC-8. In 1964, a Capitol-operated DC-8 set a world record in commercial aviation by flying nonstop from Tokyo, Japan to Wilmington, Delaware in 12 hours and 25 minutes. During the 1960s, the airline's civilian and military air cargo operations increased.

In 1967 Capitol added "International" to its name and was operating six "straight" DC-8 jets and three "stretched" Super DC-8 versions along with their fleet of piston engine propeller aircraft. In 1971 Capitol International Airways moved to Smyrna, Tennessee, at Sewart Air Force Base. Capitol remained strong as a military contract air carrier.

During the late 1970s and early 1980s it operated international and domestic scheduled passenger service in addition to charter flights.  It was founded by former Army Air Corps pilots, Jesse Stallings, Richmond McGinnis, and Francis Roach, following the end of World War II. Executive Vice President was Frank J. Sparacino. European Director of Operations was Chuck Carr, the Director France Michel Lelièvre  and the LBG Airport Manager, P. Landelle. Gatwick Ops was the European Office.  In the late 1970s, Capitol Air became a scheduled air carrier following the passage of the Airline Deregulation Act of 1978. The airline was incorporated in Delaware but headquartered in Smyrna, Tennessee.

Capitol Air maintained a large presence in the eastern United States and Europe. Its hubs were John F. Kennedy International Airport Hangar 11 in New York City, Brussels, Belgium and San Juan, Puerto Rico. From New York/JFK Capitol Air served  Los Angeles (LAX), Chicago O'Hare (ORD), Brussels (BRU), Frankfurt (FRA), Paris, France (LBG) Aguadilla (BQN), San Juan (SJU) and Puerto Plata (POP). From San Juan its served Miami, Chicago, Philadelphia, Boston and Santo Domingo. Even though Capitol commenced scheduled passenger operations, charters were still a big part of its operations. Many of the charters operated into San Juan, Puerto Rico, were for Canadian tour operators that required passenger air service in conjunction with cruises that departed San Juan every Saturday.

Capitol Air also operated many charter flights for the United States military.  One major trunk route in the mid-1970s connected Rhein-Main Air Base (Frankfurt), Germany to Charleston Air Force Base, South Carolina with a refueling stop at Bradley Air National Guard Base (co-located with Bradley International Airport) in Windsor Locks, Connecticut.

Capitol Air declared bankruptcy in the mid-1980s after George Batchelor, now Capitol's owner, had largely dismantled the airline in favor of his newly acquired venture, Arrow Air, another formerly all-charter air carrier that eventually initiated scheduled passenger airline operations.

Destinations
According to the Capitol Air system timetable dated November 5, 1981, the airline was operating scheduled passenger service to the following domestic and international destinations:

 Boston, Massachusetts (BOS)
 Brussels, Belgium (BRU)
 Chicago, Illinois - O'Hare International Airport (ORD)
 Frankfurt, Germany (FRA)
 Los Angeles, California (LAX)
 Miami, Florida (MIA)
 Newark, New Jersey - Newark Airport (EWR)
 New York City, New York - John F. Kennedy International Airport (JFK)
 Puerto Plata, Dominican Republic (POP)
 San Francisco, California (SFO)
 San Juan, Puerto Rico (SJU)
 Zurich, Switzerland (ZRH)

The above referenced timetable also states that all flights were being operated with stretched, Super Douglas DC-8 series 60 and wide body McDonnell Douglas DC-10 jetliners at this time.

Capitol Air's hub for scheduled passenger operations at this time was New York JFK Airport with nonstop transatlantic flights being operated from JFK to Brussels, Frankfurt and Zurich in Europe as well as transcontinental nonstops to Los Angeles and San Francisco in addition to nonstops to Chicago, Puerto Plata and San Juan.  The airline was also operating nonstop flights from Chicago to Los Angeles, Miami and San Francisco, and from San Juan nonstop to Boston, Miami and Newark at this same time.  By 1982, Aguadilla, Puerto Rico (BQN) and Philadelphia, Pennsylvania (PHL) had been added to Capitol Air's scheduled route system.

Fleet
Capitol operated the following aircraft types during its existence:

 Airbus A300B4
 Curtiss C-46 Commando
 Douglas DC-3
 Douglas DC-4
 Douglas DC-8-32
 Douglas DC-8-33
 Douglas DC-8-54CF
 Douglas DC-8-55CF 
 Douglas DC-8-61 - stretched Super DC-8 model
 Douglas DC-8-63CF - stretched Super DC-8 model
 Lockheed Constellation - fleet included L-749A Constellation and L-1049E, L-1049G and L-1049H Super Constellation models
 Lockheed Model 18 Lodestar
 McDonnell Douglas DC-10-10

Incidents and accidents
The airline suffered several accidents with its Curtiss C-46s between 1958 and 1967, with three resulting in fatalities. Two other notable accidents occurred with the airline's Douglas DC-8s:

On April 28, 1968, a DC-8-31 registered N1802 crashed at Atlantic City International Airport in New Jersey on a training flight. The crew was attempting a two-engine approach and touch-and-go, and lost control of the aircraft as they applied power. All four crew members survived.
On November 27, 1970, Capitol International Airways Flight C2C3/26, operated by a DC-8-63CF registered N4909C, overran the runway and collided with obstacles and a ditch while attempting to take off at Anchorage International Airport, Alaska on its way to Yokota Air Base in Japan. For reasons that could not be determined in the subsequent investigation, all eight main landing gear wheels remained locked up throughout the takeoff run, preventing the aircraft from reaching a sufficient take off speed. 47 of the 229 passengers and crew on board were killed.

Additionally, on three occasions between May and August 1983, the airline's flight 236 from San Juan, Puerto Rico to Miami was hijacked to Cuba. In all instances, the hijacker was taken into custody uneventfully.

See also 
 List of defunct airlines of the United States

References

External links

 Capitol Airways Curtiss C-46
 Capitol Airways hangar at Berry Field, Nashville, TN 1950
 Aerobernie listing of Capitol Airways fleet of aircraft
 Planelogger Capitol Airways fleet

Defunct airlines of the United States
Airlines established in 1946
Airlines disestablished in 1982
American companies established in 1946
Airlines based in Tennessee